Hamas, the governing authority in the Gaza Strip, has constructed a sophisticated network of military tunnels since it seized control of the Strip in 2007. The tunnel system branches beneath many Gazan towns and cities, such as Khan Yunis, Jabalia and the Shati refugee camp. The internal tunnels, running some dozens of kilometres within the Gaza Strip, have several functions. Hamas uses the tunnels to hide its arsenal of rocketry underground, to facilitate communication, to permit munition stocks to be hidden, and to conceal militants, making detection from the air difficult. Hamas leader Khalid Meshal said in an interview with Vanity Fair that the tunnel system is a defensive structure, designed to place obstacles against Israel's powerful military arsenal and engage in counter-strikes behind the lines of the IDF. He admitted that the tunnels are used for infiltration of Israel, but said that offensive operations have never caused the death of civilians in Israel, and denied allegations of planned mass attacks on Israeli civilians.
 
The cross-border tunnels were used in the capture of Gilad Shalit in 2006, and multiple times during the 2014 conflict. Destroying the tunnels was a primary objective of Israeli forces in the 2014 Israel–Gaza conflict2014 conflict. The IDF reported that it "neutralized" 32 tunnels, fourteen of which crossed into Israel. On at least four occasions during the conflict, Palestinian militants crossing the border through the tunnels engaged in combat with Israeli soldiers.
Officially, Israeli spokesmen has always maintained that the aim of the “terror tunnels” is to harm Israel civilians. According to Prime Minister Benjamin Netanyahu, the “sole purpose” of the cross-border tunnels from Gaza to Israel is “the destruction of our citizens and killing of our children.” But an Israeli intelligence source that spoke to Times of Israel claimed that none of the nine cross-border tunnels were aimed at civilian border communities. All the infiltration attempts have focused on attacking military targets. The main aim of the attacks seems to have been to capture an IDF prisoner.: "A senior military official estimated tonight (Thursday) in a conversation with Army Radio that the IDF can complete the task of destroying the tunnels within 48 hours. The military official said: 'all the tunnels were aimed at military targets and not at the Gaza-vicinity communities'..." The UNHRC Commission of Inquiry on the Gaza Conflict found "the tunnels were only used to conduct attacks directed at IDF positions in Israel in the vicinity of the Green Line, which are legitimate military targets." Israeli officials condemned the UNHRC report.

The UN Commission of Inquiry found the tunnels "caused great anxiety among Israelis that the tunnels might be used to attack civilians." Ihab al-Ghussein, spokesman for the Hamas-run interior ministry, describes the tunnels as an exercise of Gaza's "right to protect itself." 

Israeli officials reported four "incidents in which members of Palestinian armed groups emerged from tunnel exits located between 1.1 and 4.7 km from civilian homes." The Israeli government refers to cross-border tunnels as "attack tunnels" or "terror tunnels." According to Israel, the tunnels enabled the launch of rockets by remote control, and were intended to facilitate hostage-taking and mass-casualty attacks., citing

Origins and construction

The tunnel construction employed in the 2014 Israel–Gaza conflict has its origins in the tunnels into Egypt that were constructed to overcome Egyptian and Israeli economic blockade on the coastal enclave which has been in effect since 2007.

The tunnels into Israel were constructed using the expertise of the Rafah families who have specialized in digging tunnels into Egypt for commerce and smuggling, and have been described by former Hamas Prime Minister Ismail Haniya as representative of "a new strategy in confronting the occupation and in the conflict with the enemy from underground and from above the ground." According to Eado Hecht, an Israeli defence analyst specialising in underground warfare, "[T]hese underground complexes are fairly similar in concept to the Viet Cong tunnels dug beneath the jungles of South Vietnam, though the quality of finishing is better, with concrete walls and roofs, electricity and other required amenities for lengthy sojourn."

The Israeli military has provided estimates that Hamas spent around $30 to $90 million, and poured 600,000 tons of concrete, in order to build three dozen tunnels. Some tunnels were estimated to have cost $3 million to construct.

The Mako network published a description of the working conditions on the tunnels, citing an unnamed Israeli informant who said he worked on them, including the following details: Workers spent 8–12 hours a day on construction under precarious conditions and received a monthly wage of $150–$300. Hamas used electric or pneumatic jackhammers for digging tunnels. Tunnels were dug 18–25 meters (60–82 feet) underground at the rate of 4–5 meters a day. Tunnels were usually dug through sandy soil requiring their roof to be supported by a more durable level of clay. Tunnels were also reinforced by concrete panels manufactured in workshops adjacent to each tunnel.

Construction and use of the tunnels is associated with mortal danger due to accidental detonation of explosives and tunnel collapses. Hamas reported that 22 members of its armed wing died in tunnel accidents in 2017; another militant was killed on 22 April 2018.

Strategic objectives
According to Eado Hecht, an Israeli defence analyst specialising in underground warfare, "Three different kinds of tunnels existed beneath Gaza, smuggling tunnels between Gaza and Egypt; defensive tunnels inside Gaza, used for command centres and weapons storage; and –connected to the defensive tunnels –offensive tunnels used for cross-border attacks on Israel", including the capture of Israeli soldiers.  Palestinian military personnel in Gaza explained to news Web site al-Monitor that the purpose of a cross-border tunnel was to conduct operations behind enemy lines in the event of an Israeli operation against Gaza. A Palestinian militia document obtained by al-Monitor and also published in The Washington Post described the objectives of the under-border tunnels:

The tunnel war is one of the most important and most dangerous military tactics in the face of the Israeli army because it features a qualitative and strategic dimension, because of its human and moral effects, and because of its serious threat and unprecedented challenge to the Israeli military machine, which is heavily armed and follows security doctrines involving protection measures and preemption. ...

[The tactic is] to surprise the enemy and strike it a deadly blow that doesn't allow a chance for survival or escape or allow him a chance to confront and defend itself.

A separate Al-Monitor report describes tunnels within Gaza and away from the border that serve two purposes: storing and shielding weapons including rockets and launchers, and providing security and mobility to Hamas militants. The report states the latter function occurs in a set of "security tunnels": "Every single leader of Hamas, from its lowest ranking bureaucrats to its most senior leaders, is intimately familiar with the route to the security tunnel assigned to him and his family." Twenty-three militants in the Qassam Brigades, the military wing of Hamas, survived Israeli shelling on 17 July and remained alive but trapped in a tunnel until the early August ceasefire.

The Jerusalem Center for Public Affairs, an Israeli security think tank, describes tunnel warfare as a shifting of the balance of power: "Tunnel warfare provided armies facing a technologically superior adversary with an effective means for countering its air superiority." According to the center, tunnels conceal missile launchers, facilitate attacks on strategic targets like Ben-Gurion Airport, and allow cross-border access to Israeli territory.

The Israeli government has called the tunnels "terror tunnels," stating that they have a potential to target civilians and soldiers in Israel. Prime Minister Benjamin Netanyahu has said that the aim was to abduct and kill civilians. An IDF spokesman said the goal is "to abduct or kill civilians but will make do with a soldier, too." The Israeli newspaper Ma'ariv reported that, according to unnamed Israeli security sources, the tunnels were to be utilized in a mass casualty terror attack planned to take place on the Jewish high holy day of Rosh Hashanah, 24 September 2014. The plan was described to reporter Ariel Kahane by the sources, and reportedly revealed to the Israeli security Cabinet by Prime Minister Binyamin Netanyahu. The alleged plot entailed a planned assault in which two hundred of heavily armed Hamas fighters would have emerged at night from more than a dozen tunnels and infiltrate Israeli territory, killing and/or abducting Israeli citizens.

An unnamed "senior intelligence source" told The Times of Israel on 28 July that of the nine cross-border tunnels detected, none stretched into a civilian community, and that in the five infiltrations to that time Hamas had targeted soldiers rather than civilians. On 31 July IDF Army Radio quoted an unnamed "senior military official" as saying "all the tunnels were aimed at military targets and not at the Gaza-vicinity communities".

A column in the Wall Street Journal cited Yigal Carmon, head of the Middle East Media Research Institute who claimed that it was the tunnels, and not the 2014 kidnapping and murder of Israeli teenagers that was the immediate cause of war in the summer of 2014. According to Carmon's reading of the situation, the tunnels gave Hamas the ability to stake a mass-casualty attack on the scale of the 2008 Islamist terror attack on the Taj Hotel in Mumbai that killed 164 people. A 5 July Israeli airstrike damaged a tunnel near Kibbutz Kerem Shalom, and a group of Hamas military inspectors were killed in an explosion at the tunnel on 6 July. According to Carmon, this may have persuaded Hamas that Israel was becoming aware of the scale of the capacity for militants to infiltrate Israel via tunnels, making a successful surprise mass-casualty attack less likely, and convincing the Hamas leadership to go to war immediately before more of the tunnels could be discovered and destroyed.

An editorial in The Washington Post described the tunnels as "using tons of concrete desperately needed for civilian housing" and also as endangering civilians because they were constructed under civilian homes in the "heavily populated Shijaiyah district" and underneath the al-Wafa Hospital.

Kidnapping
Israel describes kidnapping Israeli civilians or taking Israeli soldiers hostage as one of the primary goals of tunnel construction. The Wall Street Journal described an attack tunnel inspected by one of its reporters as, "designed for launching murder and kidnapping raids. The 3-mile-long tunnel was reinforced with concrete, lined with telephone wires, and included cabins unnecessary for infiltration operations but useful for holding hostages." In October 2013, according to the newspaper Haaretz, "The IDF's working assumption (wa)s that such tunnels will be made operative whenever there is an escalation in the area, whether initiated by Hamas or by Israel, and will be used for attacks and abduction attempts. If Hamas initiates such an escalation while holding several Israeli citizens or soldiers, it would be in a much stronger position." According to The New York Times, one tunnel contained "a kidnapping kit of tranquilizers and plastic handcuffs" to facilitate kidnapping. Hamas leader Khalid Mishal denies that the tunnels were ever to be used to attack civilians: "Have any of the tunnels been used to kill any civilian or any of the residents of such towns? No. Never! . . . [Hamas] used them either to strike beyond the back lines of the Israeli army or to raid some military sites . . . This proves that Hamas is only defending itself."

Israel's countermeasures
According to Israel, between January and October 2013, three tunnels under the border were identified, two of which were packed with explosives. On 11 August 2014 the IDF announced they had successfully tested a system that could be used to detect these tunnels. This new system uses a combination of sensors and special transmitters to locate tunnels. The IDF expects development to cost up to NIS 1.5 billion, and could be deployed within the year.

In the summer of 2017, Israel began the construction of a border wall which stretched several meters underground to counter tunnel assaults. The structure is equipped with sensors to detect future tunnel construction. Concrete for the structure was produced using five concrete factories dedicated to the project and about 10 meters was completed daily. The structure was placed entirely on Israeli land.

On 30 October 2017 Israeli forces destroyed a tunnel that crossed the Gaza border into Israeli territory. Twelve Palestinians, including ten members of Islamic Jihad Movement in Palestine and two Hamas militants, were killed in the blast and subsequent rescue efforts. The most senior person killed was Brigade Commander Arafat Marshood of Islamic Jihad's al-Quds Brigades. On 10 December 2017 Israeli forces destroyed an additional tunnel that crossed the border.

In January 2018, following the destruction of an attack tunnel from Gaza that crossed into Egypt and Israel, IDF Major General Yoav Mordechai, speaking in Arabic, said, "I want to send a message to everyone who is digging or gets too close to the tunnels: As you’ve seen in the past two months, these tunnels bring only death," referring to Hamas tunnels that had recently been destroyed by Israel. Major General Eyal Zamir stated that more Hamas tunnels into Israel would be destroyed as the construction of a barrier around the Gaza Strip will soon be completed.

In April 2018, the Israeli military announced it had disabled a tunnel that stretched kilometers into Gaza, near Jabalia, and reached several meters into Israel, towards Nahal Oz. No exit had yet been built on the Israeli side. For the first time, an Israeli airstrike destroyed a naval tunnel belonging to Hamas in June 2018. In August the Israeli Ministry of Defense released the first pictures of an underwater barrier with Gaza designed to prevent Hamas infiltrations by sea. Construction of the barrier started two months before and is expected to be completed by the end of the year, stretching two hundred meters into the Mediterranean.

Israeli airstrikes destroyed over 100 kilometers of tunnel network inside Gaza during Operation Guardian of the Walls in May 2021.

In December 2021, the Israeli Ministry of Defense announced that a 65-kilometer underground barrier to deal with the threat of cross-border tunnels along the border with Gaza had been completed.

Use in attacks
Hamas used tunnel bombs to attack an Israeli outpost in Gaza, killing one Israeli, in June 2004. The organization later tunneled under another outpost and detonated a bomb in December 2004, killing five Israelis in the IDF outpost bombing attack.

In the 2006 Gaza cross-border raid, Palestinian militants used a tunnel to abduct Israeli soldier Gilad Shalit.

On 17 July 2014, Hamas militants crossed the Israeli border through a tunnel about a mile away from the farming village of Sufa but were stopped by Israeli Defense Forces. The Israeli military reported that thirteen armed men had exited the tunnel, and shared video footage of them being hit by the explosion of an airstrike. Israeli authorities claimed the purpose had been to attack civilians. Residents also expressed fears that the purpose of the incursion was to commit a massacre.

On 21 July 2014, two squads of armed Palestinian militants crossed the Israeli border through a tunnel near Kibbutz Nir Am. The first squad of ten was killed by an Israeli air strike. A second squad killed four Israeli soldiers using an anti-tank weapon. The Jerusalem Post reported that the attackers sought to infiltrate Kibbutz Nir Am, but a senior intelligence source told the Times of Israel that "the Hamas gunmen were not in motion or en route to a kibbutz but rather had camouflaged themselves in the field, laying an ambush for an army patrol."

On 28 July Hamas militants attacked an Israeli military outpost near Nahal Oz using a tunnel, killing five Israeli soldiers. One attacker was also killed.

On 1 August 2014, Hamas militants emerging from a tunnel attacked an Israeli patrol in Rafah, thus violating a humanitarian ceasefire, killing two Israeli soldiers. Israel at first believed that the militants had abducted Lieutenant Hadar Goldin and were holding him, but Israel later determined that Goldin had also been killed.

References

External links

The Gaza Tunnel Industry, Israel Defense Forces (including photos), 2018
Peering Into Darkness Beneath the Israel-Gaza Border, The New York Times, 25 July 2014 (including a map of some of the tunnels)
IDF footage of tunnel entrance built in basement of Gaza mosque
Yiftah S. Shapir and Gal Perl Finkel,  Subterranean Warfare: A New-Old Challenge, a chapter inside "The Lessons of Operation Protective Edge", eds. Anat Kurz and Shlomo Brom, INSS, 2014.

Tunnel warfare
2014 Israel–Gaza conflict
2014 in Israel
2014 in the Gaza Strip
Gaza–Israel conflict
Tunnels in Israel
Articles containing video clips
Transport in the State of Palestine